The 1947 Syracuse Orangemen football team was an American football team that represented Syracuse University as an independent during the 1947 college football season. In its first season under head coach Reaves Baysinger, the team compiled a 3–6 record and was outscored by at total of 167 to 77. Laurence Ellis was the team captain. The team played its home games at Archbold Stadium in Syracuse, New York.

Schedule

References

Syracuse
Syracuse Orange football seasons
Syracuse Orangemen football